Abiodun may refer to:

Abiodun (Oyo ruler), ruler of the Oyo people
Abiodun (musician) (born 1972), Nigerian-German musician

See also